The Seward County Courthouse is a historic building in Seward, Nebraska, and the county courthouse for Seward County. It was built in 1905-1907 on a farm formerly owned by Lewis Moffitt, the founder of Seward. It was designed in the Classical Revival style by architect George A. Berlinghof. It has been listed on the National Register of Historic Places since January 10, 1990.

References

	
Neoclassical architecture in Nebraska
County courthouses in Nebraska
Government buildings completed in 1905
National Register of Historic Places in Seward County, Nebraska
1905 establishments in Nebraska